"Give a Reason" is a song  by Japanese voice actress and recording artist Megumi Hayashibara. It was used as opening theme for the anime series Slayers Next, and on April 24, 1996 it was released as a single along with Masami Okui's song , which was used as ending theme for the same series. The single charted at number 9 on the Oricon charts, becoming Hayashibara's highest peak at the time and her first top 10 single in the Japanese charts.

In 2009 the song was again used as an insert song in Slayers Evolution-R, nine years after its original release. "Give a Reason" is considered her trademark song. It is also her best-selling single (with 232,850 copies sales) according to Oricon. It was also certified gold by the RIAJ.

Track listing

Cover versions
The song has been covered by several other Japanese voice actors, J-Pop singers and a Spanish duo.
Masami Okui
Charm - included in the album "Evolution" as a Spanish adaptation (2006)
Haruko Momoi - included in the album More & More Quality Red: Anime Song Cover (2008)
Chihiro Yonekura - included in the album Ever After (2008)
Eri Kitamura - included in the album Hyakka Seiran: Jōsei Seiyū Hen II (2008)
Ryōko Shintani - included in the album Hyakka Seiran: Jōsei Seiyū Hen III (2009)
m.o.v.e - included in the album Anim.o.v.e 01 (2009)
Shoko Nakagawa - included in the album Shokotan Cover 3: Anison wa Jinrui wo Tsunagu (2010)
Charm - included in the album "Re-Evolution" (2017)

References

1996 singles
1996 songs